Krasnoznamensky is a rural locality (a settlement) in Vakhromeyevskoye Rural Settlement, Kameshkovsky District, Vladimir Oblast, Russia. The population was 184 as of 2010. There are 4 streets.

Geography 
Krasnoznamensky is located on the Talsha River, 19 km north of Kameshkovo (the district's administrative centre) by road. Vakurino is the nearest rural locality.

References 

Rural localities in Kameshkovsky District